Kristina Topuzović (born August 23, 1994) is a Serbian women's basketball player who plays for Sepsi SIC of the Liga Națională. She also represent the Serbian national basketball team.

Club career
She began playing basketball in Šabac where she stayed until 2010. She then moved to the Belgrade-based club Radivoj Korać. In summer 2016, she moved in Montenegrin Budućnost Volcano. 

After two years in Podgorica, Kristina makes move back to Belgrade in October 2018, and links with Serbian powerhouse and one of the most refined women's basketball clubs in Europe, Crvena zvezda.

International career
She represented Serbian national basketball team at the EuroBasket 2015 in Budapest where they won the gold medal, and qualified for the 2016 Olympics, first in the history for the Serbian team.

References

External links
 Kristina Topuzović at eurobasket.com
 Kristina Topuzović at fiba.com
 Kristina Topuzović at fibaeurope.com
 

1994 births
Living people
Sportspeople from Šabac
Serbian expatriate basketball people in Montenegro
Serbian women's basketball players
Shooting guards
ŽKK Crvena zvezda players
ŽKK Radivoj Korać players
European champions for Serbia